Manduca diffissa is a moth of the family Sphingidae first described by Arthur Gardiner Butler in 1871. It is known from most of South America.

Description 
The wingspan is 100–200 mm.

Biology 
Adult moths have been recorded from July to August and from September to December.

Subspecies
Manduca diffissa diffissa (Butler, 1871) (Argentina and Uruguay)
Manduca diffissa mesosa (Rothschild & Jordan, 1916) (Argentina and Bolivia)
Manduca diffissa petuniae (Boisduval, 1875) (south-eastern Brazil, Argentina, Bolivia)
Manduca diffissa tropicalis (Rothschild & Jordan, 1903) (Guyana, French Guiana, Venezuela, Colombia, Bolivia, Brazil and Nicaragua)
Manduca diffissa zischkai (Kernbach, 1952) (Bolivia)

References

D
Moths of South America
Moths described in 1871
Taxa named by Arthur Gardiner Butler